Cape Cox is a cape which forms the northeastern extremity of Dodson Peninsula at the west side of the Ronne Ice Shelf. It was first sighted from the air by the Ronne Antarctic Research Expedition, 1947–48. It was mapped by the United States Geological Survey from ground surveys and from U.S. Navy air photos, 1961–67, and named by the Advisory Committee on Antarctic Names for Larry E. Cox, a radioman with the South Pole Station winter party in 1964.

References
 

Headlands of Palmer Land
Filchner-Ronne Ice Shelf